Qin Guorong (born 4 May 1961), commonly known as Townsend Qin, is a Chinese former footballer who played as a midfielder for Shanghai and San Francisco Bay Blackhawks, while internationally he represented China in the 1984 Asian Cup.

Playing career
Qin started his football career when he played for the Shanghai youth team before he graduated to the senior Shanghai team in the 1979 season. Zeng Xuelin would include him in the Chinese national team squad that competed in the 1984 Asian Cup where China came runners-up. He was subsequently dropped from the Chinese team by Gao Fengwen and Qin moved to the United States in 1987. In 1989, Qin signed with the San Francisco Bay Blackhawks of the Western Soccer League.  In 1990, the WSL merged with the American Soccer League to form the American Professional Soccer League.  Qin continued to play for the Blackhawks in the new league.  He was a 1990 and 1991 First Team All Star and continued to play for the Blackhawks through the 1992 season.

Career statistics

International

References

External links
Team China Stats

1961 births
1984 AFC Asian Cup players
American Professional Soccer League players
Chinese footballers
Chinese expatriate footballers
China international footballers
Shanghai Shenhua F.C. players
San Francisco Bay Blackhawks players
Western Soccer Alliance players
Living people
Footballers at the 1986 Asian Games
Association football midfielders
Asian Games competitors for China
people from Shanghai